Marcelo Martins Moreno (born 18 June 1987), known as Marcelo Martins in Bolivia and as Marcelo Moreno in other countries, is a Bolivian professional footballer who plays as a striker for Paraguayan Primera División club Cerro Porteño and captains the Bolivia national team. He is considered one of the greatest Bolivian players of all time. With 30 goals, he is the national team's all-time top goalscorer.

Club career
Moreno was born in Santa Cruz de la Sierra, Bolivia. He began his career at Oriente Petrolero. In 2003, Martins debuted for the club as a 16-year-old in Bolivia's Primera División.

He moved to Vitória, becoming first choice in 2006, at the Campeonato Brasileiro Série C. He scored 12 goals in the competition, four less than the top goalscorer. In the middle of 2007, he moved to Cruzeiro, becoming first choice only in the next year, when he scored 8 goals at the 2008 Copa Libertadores, being the top goalscorer, alongside Salvador Cabañas.

On 27 May 2008, he signed a five-year contract with Shakhtar Donetsk. The Ukrainian club agreed to pay €9 million for the player. On 1 November, he scored a brace in a 3–1 league match win against Zorya Luhansk. Even though he had won the 2008–09 UEFA Cup, on 29 May 2009, unable to establish himself in Donetsk, Moreno joined German club Werder Bremen on loan. Bremen had initially attempted to sign Moreno the previous summer, but the player opted for Shakhtar.

In a 2009 interview, Martins remarked that he didn't want to go to Ukraine at the moment of signing with Shakhtar, but that was the way the negotiation was produced. He commented that it was a difficult moment but it was a moment of adaptation to a new football.

In 2009, he said that when speaking in Portuguese with team mates Naldo and Hugo Almeida that he would feel Brazilian, that Brazil was an important country in his life cause he lived in it for half of his life.

On 2 August 2009, he scored a double in a 2009–10 DFB-Pokal match that ended in a 5–0 victory against Union Berlin. On 29 January 2010, Bremen terminated his contract and he returned to Shakhtar Donetsk. On transfer deadline day, a six-month loan deal between Shakhtar and Wigan Athletic was agreed to take the player to the Premier League. He signed for them on 1 February on loan. After returning to Shakhtar, he made a decent impression, scoring 7 times in 23 appearances. However, after being listed as a reserve the next season, Moreno joined Grêmio in late December 2011 and signed a five-year contract with the Brazilian team starting in 2012. He was then loaned to Flamengo in the 2013 season and Cruzeiro in 2014.

In February 2015, Moreno transferred to Chinese Super League side Changchun Yatai. His first season in China was successful, scoring 20+ goals in 53 games. In 2017 he signed for Wuhan Zall in the Chinese League One being the joint top scorer in his first season with 23 league goals, along with Colombian Harold Preciado. In 2019 Moreno signed with Shijiazhuang Ever Bright. Although he only played 12 games with them, he scored 7 goals.

On 19 February 2020, Moreno returned for his former club, Cruzeiro, signing with them for 3 seasons.

On 30 January 2022, ABC Color announced that Martins would join Primera División Paraguaya team Cerro Porteño. He would be the attacking replacement of Argentine Mauro Boselli. The transfer took effect on 9 February 2022 of Paraguay's summer transfer window. On 10 February, Martins arrived to Paraguay and was officially presented at Cerro Porteño. He signed for 2 years. He was presented with the number 9 shirt. His salary would not be paid by the club, instead by a private company would. Before signing, Martins spoke with Cerro Porteño coach Francisco Arce, who sent him videos so he can adapt to his play as quick as possible. Martins remarked that Arce was important so that he could join Cerro Porteño. His arrival into Paraguay was made through Cerro Porteño's director, Miguel Carrizosa, who lent his airplane to bring Martins. He became Cerro Porteño's 5th signing ahead of the 2022 Primera División season, following William Riveros, Robert Piris Da Motta, Sergio Díaz and Alfio Oviedo.

International career
Born in Bolivia to a Brazilian father (Mauro Martins, former footballer) and Bolivian mother, Moreno played for the Brazilian under-18 and under-20 sides at the youth level, becoming the first foreign player to be part of this youth setup and the fifth foreign player to wear the Brazilian national team's shirt in an official match, but chose to represent the Bolivian senior national team as a professional.

Due to his success playing for Cruzeiro, Moreno received his first call-up for a friendly match against Peru on 12 September 2007. He scored his first two international goals on 20 November 2007, during a 2010 World Cup qualifier against Venezuela. On 14 October 2008, he scored both of Bolivia's goals against Uruguay in a 2–2 draw. He also opened the scoring in Bolivia's historic 6–1 victory over Diego Maradona's Argentina on 1 April 2009. A few months later, in October, he scored the winning goal in a 2–1 victory against powerhouse Brazil at Estadio Hernando Siles.

Moreno was included in the Bolivia squad for the 2015 Copa América in Chile. On 15 June, he scored the decisive goal in the team's second group match – a 3–2 defeat of Ecuador – to give La Verde its first win at the Copa América since the 1997 tournament. He was Bolivia's top scorer at the tournament with two goals, also being the only Bolivian player to score in the knockout stage as the side lost 3–1 to Peru in the quarter-finals. Moreno announced his retirement from the national squad on 15 September 2015 together with then captain Ronald Raldes, claiming divergences with head coach Julio César Baldivieso.

Moreno returned to the national squad in 2016 after Guillermo Ángel Hoyos replaced Baldivieso.

On 12 November 2020, Moreno scored his 20th international goal in a 3–2 defeat to Ecuador, equaling Joaquín Botero's all-time top goalscoring record for Bolivia.

Career statistics

Club

International

Scores and results list Bolivia's goal tally first, score column indicates score after each Moreno goal.

Honours
Vitória
 Campeonato Baiano: 2005, 2007

Cruzeiro
 Campeonato Brasileiro Série A: 2014
 Campeonato Mineiro: 2008, 2014

Shakhtar Donetsk
 Ukrainian Premier League: 2010–11
 UEFA Cup: 2008–09

Werder Bremen
 DFL-Supercup: 2009

Flamengo
 Copa do Brasil: 2013

Individual
Copa Libertadores de América top scorer: 2008
China League One top goalscorer: 2017

References

External links

1987 births
Living people
Sportspeople from Santa Cruz de la Sierra
Bolivian people of Brazilian descent
Sportspeople of Brazilian descent
People with acquired Brazilian citizenship
Brazilian footballers
Brazilian people of Bolivian descent
Bolivian footballers
Association football forwards
Oriente Petrolero players
Esporte Clube Vitória players
Cruzeiro Esporte Clube players
Grêmio Foot-Ball Porto Alegrense players
CR Flamengo footballers
FC Shakhtar Donetsk players
SV Werder Bremen players
Wigan Athletic F.C. players
Changchun Yatai F.C. players
Wuhan F.C. players
Cerro Porteño players
Cangzhou Mighty Lions F.C. players
Campeonato Brasileiro Série C players
Campeonato Brasileiro Série A players
Ukrainian Premier League players
Bundesliga players
Premier League players
Chinese Super League players
China League One players
UEFA Cup winning players
Paraguayan Primera División players
Brazil youth international footballers
Bolivia international footballers
2011 Copa América players
2015 Copa América players
2019 Copa América players
2021 Copa América players
Bolivian expatriate footballers
Expatriate footballers in Ukraine
Expatriate footballers in Germany
Expatriate footballers in England
Expatriate footballers in China
Expatriate footballers in Paraguay
Bolivian expatriate sportspeople in Ukraine
Bolivian expatriate sportspeople in Germany
Bolivian expatriate sportspeople in England
Bolivian expatriate sportspeople in China
Bolivian expatriate sportspeople in Paraguay
Brazilian expatriate footballers
Brazilian expatriate sportspeople in Ukraine
Brazilian expatriate sportspeople in Germany
Brazilian expatriate sportspeople in England
Brazilian expatriate sportspeople in China
Brazilian expatriate sportspeople in Paraguay